Arthur Mesley (7 August 1876 – 9 January 1958) was an Australian rules footballer who played for the Geelong Football Club in the Victorian Football League (VFL).

Notes

External links 

1876 births
1958 deaths
People from Omeo
Australian rules footballers from Victoria (Australia)
Geelong Football Club players